Jean Gordon "Gene" McMurray (July 25, 1902 – January 2, 1971) was an American football, basketball, and baseball coach. He served as the head football coach at Milligan College—now known as Milligan University—in Milligan College, Tennessee from 1929 to 1931 and East Tennessee State College—now known as East Tennessee State University—in Johnson City, Tennessee from 1932 to 1946. McMurray was also the head basketball coach at East Tennessee State from 1933 to 1947.

A native of Huntington, Indiana, McMurray was a graduate of Maryville College in Maryville, Tennessee. He earned a master's degree from Peabody College and Vanderbilt University and a doctorate in physical education from New York University. McMurray resigned from his coaching post at East Tennessee State in 1947 to head the physical education department at the University of Mississippi (Ole Miss). He died on January 2, 1971 in Oxford, Mississippi after an apparent heart attack.

Head coaching record

College football

References

1902 births
1971 deaths
Maryville Scots baseball players
Maryville Scots football players
Maryville Scots men's basketball players
East Tennessee State Buccaneers baseball coaches
East Tennessee State Buccaneers football coaches
East Tennessee State Buccaneers men's basketball coaches
Milligan Buffaloes athletic directors
Milligan Buffaloes football coaches
Milligan Buffaloes men's basketball coaches
University of Mississippi faculty
New York University alumni
Vanderbilt University alumni 
People from Huntington, Indiana